The women's individual recurve competition at the 2009 World Archery Championships took place on 3–9 September 2009 in Ulsan, South Korea. 97 archers took part in the qualification round on 3 September. As there were fewer than 128 entrants, all archers qualified for the 7-round knockout round on 6 September which was drawn according to their qualification round scores. The semi-finals and finals then took place on 9 September.

Like the men's competition, the final was an all-Korean affair, with third seed Joo Hyun-jung defeating first seeds Kwak Ye-ji by just one point. It marked the last World Archery Championships in which 12 arrow shoot-offs were used for the individual recurve competition elimination rounds; from 2011 the Olympic Round scoring system was adopted.

Seeds
The top 31 qualifiers received byes to the second round.

Draw

Top Half

Section 1

Section 2

Section 3

Section 4

Bottom Half

Section 5

Section 6

Section 7

Section 8

Finals

References

2009 World Archery Championships
World